Sanyasi Mera Naam is a 1999 Indian Hindi-language action film directed by Imran Khalid, starring Mithun Chakraborty, Kader Khan, Milind Gunaji and Dhananjay Singh. The film also has Dharmendra in a special appearance.

Plot
A man cheats local villagers as Sanyasi (Monk). Police chase him, while escaping from the police, he accidentally kills a man and reaches a village. He takes shelter in a house but soon finds that he is staying in the house of the man he killed. Now the Sanyasi turns into a changed person and protects the family from local goons.

Cast
Mithun Chakraborty as sanyasi
Dharmendra 
Siddharth Dhawan
Shalini Kapoor 
Kader Khan
Mohan Joshi
Tej Sapru
Suvarna Mathew
Yunus Parvez 
Sonia Sahni 
Satyen Kappu
Rudraksh
Mushtaq Khan
Dhananjay Singh
Johny Nirmal
Bobby Saini
Roshini Jaffery

Music
All songs are written by Sameer Anjaan.
"Arrey Arrey Arrey Arrey" - Poornima, Vinod Rathod
"Pyar Da Uda Eda" - Jaspinder Narula, Sonu Nigam
"Main Saara Din Royi Mai Rat Bhar Na Soi" - Poornima
"Hai Khwabo Ki Tu Rani" - Vishwajeet Mukherjee
"Aashiq Hai Ladke" - Sonu Nigam, Jaspinder Narula

References

External links
 

Films scored by Anand–Milind
1999 films
1990s Hindi-language films
Mithun's Dream Factory films
Films shot in Ooty
Indian action films